Callan Beasy (born 19 March 1982) is a former Australian rules footballer who played for Carlton.

Beasy was drafted with the 61st selection in the 2000 AFL Draft, but did not make his AFL debut until late in 2002 when Carlton suffered from a high number of injuries. He played in six of the last seven games of the 2003 season and had high hopes for the 2004 season, however he was delisted after the 2004 season after a disappointing three games.  He joined the Bendigo Bombers for the 2005 and 2006 seasons. before returning to the Swan Hill Football Club, as playing-coach in 2007. Beasy is still playing at the club as of 2015; he won premierships with the club in 2008 and 2011 as playing-coach.

References

Sources

Holmesby, Russell & Main, Jim (2007). The Encyclopedia of AFL Footballers. 7th ed. Melbourne: Bas Publishing.

External links

1982 births
Australian rules footballers from Victoria (Australia)
Carlton Football Club players
Living people
Bendigo Pioneers players